Andrea Miller may refer to:

 Andrea Miller (publisher), founder and CEO of media company Tango
 Andrea Miller (athlete) (born 1982), New Zealand hurdler and weightlifter